Ning County or Ningxian is a county in the east of Gansu province, China. It is under the administration of the prefecture-level city of Qingyang. Its postal code is 745200, and its population in 1999 was  people.

History 
The area of Ningxian is one of the earliest sites of Chinese civilization. The capital of the Yiqu was located in present Ningxian. Ningxian was established as a county during the Qin dynasty, later it was known as Ningzhou. In 1913 its name was changed to the present Ningxian.

Geography 
Ningxian is located on the Loess Plateau and has a rather humid climate. The main rivers in the county are the Jinghe river and the Malian river. A significant area of the county is forested.

Climate

Economy 
The county relies mostly on agriculture, its produce includes mutton, apples, apricots,  carrots, dates, day lilies and morel mushrooms.

The town of Changqingqiao is the industry cluster of the county, home to chemical industry utilizing its coal, oil and natural gas reserves.

Administrative divisions
Ning County is divided to 14 towns and 4 townships.
Towns

Townships

Transportation 
G22 Qingdao–Lanzhou Expressway
China National Highway 211

See also
 List of administrative divisions of Gansu

References

  Official website (Chinese)

Ning County
Qingyang